Ali Nassar (born 1954) is an Arab-Israeli film director. Nassar was born in the Galilee village of Arraba, and graduated from the University of Moscow in 1981 with a degree in film. Returning to Haifa, he started a theatre group and also worked as a photographer for a daily newspaper.

See also
Cinema of Israel

Filmography
 (1993): The Babysitter
 (1997): The Milky Way
 (2002): In the 9th Month
 (2008): Whispering Embers
 (2015): Lechudim Betoch HaReshet

References

External links 

Ali Nassar on "Dreams of a Nation"

1954 births
Living people
Arab-Israeli film directors
Palestinian film directors
People from Arraba, Israel